Gerard Sithunywa Ndlovu (March 11, 1939 – March 13, 2013) was the Roman Catholic bishop of the Diocese of Umzimkulu in South Africa.

Born in Gobamahlambu, Ndlovu was ordained to the priesthood on the 4 July 1970 and was named bishop on the 22 December 1984 by Pope John Paul II. He was ordained as Bishop of Umzimkulu on 25 April 1987 and on 22 August 1994 Ndlovu tendered his resignation due to health reasons.

Emeritus Bishop Ndlovu died on 13 March 2013 in Umzimkulu.

References

1939 births
2013 deaths
20th-century Roman Catholic bishops in South Africa
Roman Catholic bishops of Umzimkulu